Roald Amundsen (often abbreviated Roald; named in honor of Norwegian polar explorer Roald Amundsen), originally named Vilm, is a German steel-ship built on the Elbe River in 1952. Having worked in different areas, she was refitted in 1992 to 1993 as a brig (two-masted square-rigged sailing ship) and now serves as a sail training ship. During summer, she usually operates in the Baltic Sea, and usually embarks for journeys to farther destinations for winter, including several trans-Atlantic crossings.

Description 

Roald Amundsen has an 8-cylinder Buckau-Wolff diesel engine rated at  named Emma. The ship can carry 180 tons of ballast. Roald Amundsen has crew of 17 with up to 31 trainees embarked.

Ship history 

The hull of the ship was built at the shipyard Roßlauer Werft on the Elbe River in Roßlau, German Democratic Republic, in 1952. Originally intended for fishing as a deep sea fishing lugger, plans were changed before the completion of the ship, and she was then instead built as a type of tanker. The vessel was completed at the shipyard Peene-Werft in Wolgast, Germany, on the Baltic Sea.

Named Vilm, the ship was put to use for the National People's Army (NVA), first as a tanker and supply vessel, operating out of Peenemünde and crewed mainly by civilian seamen. Converted to a transporter for bilge water in the 1970s on the Peene-Werft, Vilm then made regular trips to the bases of the National People's Army to take the ships' bilge water to a centralized treatment facility. This service was discontinued at the end of 1988.

After not having been used for a year, Vilm was towed to Neustadt in Holstein and there at the navy base used as living quarters. At the beginning of 1991, the ship was put up for sale by the Vebeg GmbH, a corporation to sell federal property.

Detlev Löll and Hanns Temme purchased the ship at an auction and, with the help of some of the former crew, sailed the ship to Wolgast in Mecklenburg-Vorpommern. In spring 1992, a complete overhaul began, in the course of which the ship received a new exterior keel and was refitted as a brig; the rig includes five square sails at each mast and includes lifting yards for the upper-three yards (upper main topsail, topgallant and royal) at each mast, lowering the center of gravity of the ship when sails are furled.

In 1993, the ship was put to its new use under the name of Roald Amundsen. It was chartered by the newly founded sail training club LebenLernen auf Segelschiffen e.V. (short: LLaS; German: learning to live on sailing ships). After a short intermezzo with another sail-training club, Segelschiff Fritjof Nansen e.V., in 1993, Roald Amundsen has since been chartered by the LLaS and used for sail training.

Roald Amundsen now operates all year around as a sail training vessel with voyages lasting between one and three weeks. Her home port is Eckernförde, a harbour city in Schleswig-Holstein near Kiel in northern Germany. Summer months are spent with voyages on the Baltic Sea from Denmark to Baltic countries or the North Sea. Winters are spent in warmer regions. Roald Amundsen has repeatedly crossed the Atlantic Ocean, bound for South American ports in Brazil and French Guiana (1998), for tall ships events in North America (2000, 2010), and for the Caribbean (2001, 2011/12, 2012/13). Further destinations include Iceland (1995), England and Ireland (2006), the Mediterranean (2006/07, 2007/08), the Canary Islands (1995), and others. During her North American voyage in 2010, Roald Amundsen visited the Great Lakes and there met with the US brig ; the two brigs formed an unofficial friendship, and as of 2013, Roald Amundsen still flies a flag of Niagara at some occasions such as the Tall Ship Parade at Kiel Week. Another friendship, based on their respective crews on board for Kiel Week, has been formed with the German wooden schooner Amphitrite; both ships have established a tradition of berthing next to each other during the event.

The ship has participated in the Tall Ships' Races and is rated as a Class A tall ship by Sail Training International.

References

External links 

 Website of the brig Roald Amundsen

Individual sailing vessels
Tall ships of Germany
Brigs
Training ships
1952 ships
Ships built in Wolgast
Ships of East Germany